King Wu of Zhou was the first king of the Zhou dynasty of China. The chronology of his reign is disputed but is generally thought to have begun around 1046 BC and ended three years later in 1043 BC.

King Wu's ancestral name was Ji and given name Fa. He was the second son of King Wen of Zhou and Queen Taisi. In most accounts, his older brother Bo Yikao was said to have predeceased his father, typically at the hands of King Zhou, the last king of the Shang dynasty; in the Book of Rites, however, it is assumed that his inheritance represented an older tradition among the Zhou of passing over the eldest son. (Fa's grandfather Jili had likewise inherited Zhou despite two older brothers.)

Upon his succession, Fa worked with his father-in-law Jiang Ziya to accomplish an unfinished task: overthrowing the Shang dynasty. During the ninth year of his reign, Fa marched down the Yellow River to the Mengjin ford and met with more than 800 dukes. He constructed an ancestral tablet naming his father Chang King Wen and placed it on a chariot in the middle of the host; considering the timing unpropitious, though, he did not yet attack Shang. In 1046 BC, King Wu took advantage of Shang disunity to launch an attack along with many neighboring dukes. The Battle of Muye destroyed Shang's forces and King Zhou of Shang set his palace on fire, dying within.

King Wu  the name means "Martial"  followed his victory by establishing many feudal states under his 16 younger brothers and clans allied by marriage, but his death three years later provoked several rebellions against his young heir King Cheng and the regent Duke of Zhou, even from three of his brothers.

A burial mound in Zhouling town, Xianyang, Shaanxi was once thought to be King Wu's tomb. It was fitted with a headstone bearing Wu's name in the Qing dynasty. Modern archeology has since concluded that the tomb is not old enough to be from the Zhou dynasty, and is more likely to be that of a Han dynasty royal. The true location of King Wu's tomb remains unknown, but is likely to be in the Xianyang-Xi'an area.

Wu is considered one of the great heroes of China, together with Yellow Emperor and Yu the Great.

Family
Queens:
 Yi Jiang, of the Lü lineage of the Jiang clan of Qi, the first daughter of the Great Duke of Qi; the mother of Song and Yu

Sons:
 Prince Song (1060–1020 BC), ruled as King Cheng of Zhou from 1042 to 1021 BC
 Second son, ruled as the Monarch of Yu, the ancestor of the surname Yu (于)
 Third son, Prince Yu, ruled as the Marquis of Tang from 1042 BC
 A son who ruled as the Marquis of Ying
 A son who ruled as the Marquis of Han

Daughters:
 First daughter, Da Ji
 Married Duke Hu of Chen (1071–986 BC)
 Youngest daughter, personal name Lan
 Married Duke Yǐ of Qi (d. 933 BC)

Ancestry

See also
Family tree of ancient Chinese emperors

References

1043 BC deaths
Zhou dynasty kings
11th-century BC Chinese monarchs
Investiture of the Gods characters
Shang dynasty people
Year of birth unknown
Founding monarchs